Alexandre de Rhodes  (15 March 1593 – 5 November 1660) was an Avignonese Jesuit missionary and lexicographer who had a lasting impact on Christianity in Vietnam. He wrote the Dictionarium Annamiticum Lusitanum et Latinum, the first trilingual Vietnamese-Portuguese-Latin dictionary, published  in Rome, in 1651.

Biography 

Alexandre de Rhodes was born in Avignon, Papal States (now in France). According to some sources, he was a descendant of Jewish origin. His paternal side was from Aragón, Spain. He entered the novitiate of the Society of Jesus in Rome on 24 April 1612 to dedicate his life to missionary work.

In 1624, he was sent to the East Asia, arriving in the Nguyễn-controlled domain of Đàng Trong (Cochinchina) on a boat with fellow Jesuit Girolamo Maiorica. De Rhodes studied Vietnamese under Francisco de Pina before returning to Portuguese Macau.

Following the successful visit of fellow Jesuits Giuliano Baldinotti and Julio Koga to Đàng Ngoài (Tonkin) in 1626, the superior André Palmeiro sent Alexandre de Rhodes and Pero Marques, Sr. to evangelize in this domain of North Vietnam. The two missionaries landed in Thanh Hoá on March 19, 1627 (the Feast of Saint Joseph) and arrived the capital Thăng Long (nowadays Hanoi) on July 2 (the Feast of Visitation). De Rhodes worked there until 1630, when he was forced to leave. During these three years he was in and around the court at Hanoi during the rule of lord Trịnh Tráng. It was during that time that he composed the Ngắm Mùa Chay, a popular Catholic devotion to this day, meditating upon the Passion of Christ in the Vietnamese language. He was expelled from Vietnam in 1630 as Trịnh Tráng became concerned about him being a spy for the Nguyen. Rhodes in his reports said he converted more than 6,000 Vietnamese. Daily conversation in Vietnam "resembles the singing of birds", wrote Alexandre de Rhodes.

From Đàng Ngoài Rhodes went to Macau, where he spent ten years. He then returned to Vietnam, this time to Đàng Trong, mainly around Huế. He spent six years in this part until he aroused the displeasure of lord Nguyễn Phúc Lan and was condemned to death.

As his sentence was reduced to exile, Rhodes returned to Rome by 1649 and pleaded for increased funding for Catholic missions to Vietnam, telling somewhat exaggerated stories about the natural riches to be found in Vietnam. This plea by Alexandre de Rhodes helped to found the Paris Foreign Missions Society in 1659. As neither the Portuguese nor the Pope showed interest in the project, Alexandre de Rhodes, with Pope Alexander VII's agreement, found secular volunteers in Paris in the persons of François Pallu and Pierre Lambert de la Motte, the first members of the Paris Foreign Missions Society, who were sent to the Far-East as Apostolic vicars.

Alexandre de Rhodes himself was sent to Persia instead of back to Vietnam. Rhodes died in Isfahan, Persia in 1660 and was buried in the New Julfa Armenian Cemetery.

In 1943, the French colony of Indochina issued a 30c postage stamp honoring him. In 2001 Vietnamese artist Nguyen Dinh Dang created a painting in homage to Alexandre de Rhodes and Nguyen Van Vinh.

Works
While in Vietnam, de Rhodes developed an early Vietnamese alphabet based on work by earlier Portuguese missionaries such as Gaspar do Amaral, António Barbosa and Francisco de Pina. De Rhodes compiled a catechism, and a trilingual dictionary and grammar, . Both published in Rome in 1651, de Rhodes's works reflect his favor of this new Latin-script alphabet instead of Nôm script. Later refined as chữ Quốc ngữ, it eventually became the de facto written form of Vietnamese language in the 20th century. Meanwhile, Maiorica's catechism and devotional texts reflect the favor of chữ Nôm, which was the dominant script of Vietnamese Christian literature until the 20th century.

De Rhodes also wrote several books about Vietnam and his travels there, including:

  (Rome, 1650)
  (Lyon, 1652)
  (Lyon, 1651), translated by Henri Albi
  (Paris, 1653), translated into English as Rhodes of Viet Nam: The Travels and Missions of Father Alexandre de Rhodes in China and Other Kingdoms of the Orient (1666)
  (The Glorious Death of Andrew, Catechist) (pub. 1653)

Notes

Sources
Tigers in the Rice, W. Sheldon p. 26 (1969)
Catholic Encyclopedia entry on Alexandre de Rhodes
Trần Duy Nhiên and Roland Jacques (2007). "Phản hồi bài viết của Gs Ts Phạm Văn Hường". Archived from the original.
Nguyễn Đình Đầu (2007). "Về bài báo vu khống và phỉ báng cha Ðắc Lộ". Nguyệt san Công giáo và Dân tộc số 145.
Antôn Bùi Kim Phong (2017). "Alexandre de Rhodes S.J. Nhà truyền giáo".

External links
 Portuguese Missionaries and their Influence on Vietnamese

Clergy from Avignon
1593 births
1660 deaths
People of the Papal States
Roman Catholic missionaries in Vietnam
17th-century Italian Jesuits
Linguists
Creators of writing systems
History of Catholicism in Vietnam
Translators from Latin
Translators to Vietnamese
Roman Catholic missionaries in Iran
Missionary linguists